Kwesi Ahwoi (born 17 November 1946) is a former Minister for the Interior of Ghana. In 2015, he became the first Ghanaian ambassador to Comoros, he also doubles as the ambassador of Ghana in 4 other countries; Lesotho, Mauritius, Seychelles and Swaziland.

Early life and education
Kwesi Ahwoi attended Prempeh College at Kumasi where he obtained his GCE Ordinary Level in 1965. His sixth form education was at St. Augustine's College (Cape Coast) where he passed the GCE Advanced Level in 1967. His undergraduate education was at the University of Cape Coast where he obtained the Bachelor of Arts in Economics, Geography and Education. Between 1980 and 1981, he studied for the Post Graduate Certificates in Budgeting and Financial Management and from the Ghana Institute of Management and Public Administration. During 1985 and 1986, he studied for the Postgraduate Certificate in Planning and Resource Management at the University of Maryland, College Park, United States.

Career
Ahwoi has held various positions in government and business. He was the chief executive officer of the Ghana Investment Promotion Centre during the Rawlings era. Following the December 2008 presidential election, he was appointed Minister for Food and Agriculture by President John Atta Mills. In January 2013, Ahwoi was appointed Minister for the Interior of Ghana by President John Dramani Mahama. He held that position until 16 July 2014.

Personal life
Kwesi Ahwoi is married with seven children. Kwamena Ahwoi and Ato Ahwoi, both brothers of Kwesi served in the Rawlings government.

See also
List of Mahama government ministers
List of Mills government ministers

References

External links and sources
Profile on Ghana government website

Living people
1946 births
Interior ministers of Ghana
Agriculture ministers of Ghana
University of Cape Coast alumni
University of Maryland, College Park alumni
National Democratic Congress (Ghana) politicians
High Commissioners of Ghana to South Africa
Ambassadors of Ghana to the Comoros
High Commissioners of Ghana to Eswatini
High Commissioners of Ghana to Lesotho
High Commissioners of Ghana to Mauritius
High Commissioners of Ghana to Seychelles
St. Augustine's College (Cape Coast) alumni
Prempeh College alumni